Comella is a genus of moths of the family Callidulidae.

Species
Comella insularis Joicey & Talbot, 1916
Comella laetifica (C. & R. Felder, 1860)

References

Callidulidae
Taxa named by Arnold Pagenstecher
Moth genera